Lawson Matthews (born 18 March 1943) is a Jamaican cricketer. He played three first-class matches for Jamaica between 1964 and 1966.

References

External links
 

1943 births
Living people
Jamaican cricketers
Jamaica cricketers
Sportspeople from Kingston, Jamaica